Jordan Roughead (born 3 November 1990) is a former Australian rules footballer who played for the Collingwood Football Club and the Western Bulldogs in the Australian Football League (AFL). He is the cousin of former Hawthorn player Jarryd Roughead.

AFL career

Western Bulldogs (2010–2018) 
Selected with the 31st selection in the 2008 AFL Draft, after playing for the North Ballarat Rebels in the TAC Cup, Roughead plays as a ruckman but is capable of filling a key position up forward and in defence.

In round 5 of 2010, Roughead made his AFL debut against Adelaide at Etihad Stadium. He performed well, gathering 9 disposals (3 kicks and 6 handballs), taking 4 marks, making 3 tackles and kicking a goal.
 
During the 2012 season, Bulldogs coach Brendan McCartney moved Roughead into defence. He remained in this position until mid-2015 when McCartney's successor as coach, Luke Beveridge, moved him back into the ruck.

Roughead was announced as the vice captain for 2015. However, he relinquished the position at the end of the season, choosing instead to focus on his sole performance as footballer.

In 2016, Roughead played in the Bulldogs' drought-breaking 22-point Grand Final win against the Sydney Swans, amassing 13 disposals and 17 hit-outs from 75% game time.

Collingwood (2019–2022) 
At the end of the 2018 season, Roughead was traded to Collingwood in the last 30 minutes of the AFL trade period.

On May 27th 2022, Roughead announced his retirement after 201 games. He had only played 1 game in the first 10 rounds due to a finger injury.

Statistics
Statistics are correct to the end of the 2022 season

|- 
! scope="row" style="text-align:center" | 2010
|
| 23 || 8 || 3 || 7 || 37 || 53 || 90 || 32 || 19 || 74 || 0.4 || 0.9 || 4.6 || 6.6 || 11.3 || 4.0 || 2.4 || 9.3
|- 
! scope="row" style="text-align:center" | 2011
|
| 23 || 9 || 3 || 5 || 43 || 58 || 101 || 28 || 28 || 76 || 0.3 || 0.6 || 4.8 || 6.4 || 11.2 || 3.1 || 3.1 || 8.4
|-  
! scope="row" style="text-align:center" | 2012
|
| 23 || 18 || 4 || 8 || 98 || 97 || 195 || 76 || 48 || 105 || 0.2 || 0.4 || 5.4 || 5.4 || 10.8 || 4.2 || 2.7 || 5.8
|- 
! scope="row" style="text-align:center" | 2013
|
| 23 || 22 || 2 || 1 || 117 || 117 || 234 || 105 || 65 || 12 || 0.1 || 0.0 || 5.3 || 5.3 || 10.6 || 4.8 || 3.0 || 0.5
|-  
! scope="row" style="text-align:center" | 2014
|
| 23 || 15 || 0 || 1 || 92 || 79 || 171 || 66 || 32 || 7 || 0.0 || 0.1 || 6.1 || 5.3 || 11.4 || 4.4 || 2.1 || 0.5
|- 
! scope="row" style="text-align:center" | 2015
|
| 23 || 16 || 4 || 2 || 82 || 78 || 160 || 66 || 54 || 170 || 0.3 || 0.1 || 5.1 || 4.9 || 10.0 || 4.1 || 3.4 || 10.6
|-  
| scope=row bgcolor=F0E68C | 2016# 
|
| 23 || 25 || 8 || 10 || 148 || 126 || 274 || 86 || 87 || 382 || 0.3 || 0.4 || 5.9 || 5.0 || 11.0 || 3.4 || 3.5 || 15.3
|- 
! scope="row" style="text-align:center" | 2017
|
| 23 || 13 || 4 || 2 || 77 || 75 || 152 || 30 || 47 || 246 || 0.3 || 0.2 || 5.9 || 5.8 || 11.7 || 2.3 || 3.6 || 18.9
|-  
! scope="row" style="text-align:center" | 2018
|
| 23 || 12 || 6 || 6 || 78 || 63 || 141 || 50 || 35 || 146 || 0.5 || 0.5 || 6.5 || 5.3 || 11.8 || 4.2 || 2.9 || 12.2
|- 
! scope="row" style="text-align:center" | 2019
|
| 23 || 24 || 1 || 0 || 167 || 116 || 283 || 124 || 43 || 17 || 0.0 || 0.0 || 7.0 || 4.8 || 11.8 || 5.2 || 1.8 || 0.7
|-  
! scope="row" style="text-align:center" | 2020
|
| 23 || 17 || 0 || 0 || 90 || 67 || 157 || 64 || 18 || 0 || 0.0 || 0.0 || 5.3 || 3.9 || 9.2 || 3.8 || 1.1 || 0.0
|- 
! scope="row" style="text-align:center" | 2021
|
| 23 || 21 || 0 || 0 || 190 || 87 || 277 || 137 || 35 || 9 || 0.0 || 0.0 || 9.0 || 4.1 || 13.2 || 6.5 || 1.7 || 0.4
|-  
! scope="row" style="text-align:center" | 2022
|
| 23 || 1 || 0 || 0 || 4 || 2 || 6 || 3 || 0 || 0 || 0.0 || 0.0 || 4.0 || 2.0 || 6.0 || 3.0 || 0.0 || 0.0
|- class="sortbottom"
! colspan=3| Career
! 201
! 35
! 42
! 1223
! 1018
! 2241
! 867
! 511
! 1244
! 0.2
! 0.2
! 6.1
! 5.1
! 11.1
! 4.3
! 2.5
! 6.2
|}

Notes

Honours and achievements
AFL

 1x AFL Premiership Player: 2016

Western Bulldogs

 1x Tony Liberatore Award (Most Improved Player): 2016
 Chris Grant Award (Best First Year Player): 2010

Personal life 
Roughead grew up a Bulldogs supporter. His cousin is four-time premiership player and former Hawthorn captain Jarryd Roughead. He is currently studying a Master of Business Administration at Deakin University.

References

External links

1990 births
Living people
Western Bulldogs players
Western Bulldogs Premiership players
Williamstown Football Club players
Australian rules footballers from Victoria (Australia)
Greater Western Victoria Rebels players
Collingwood Football Club players
One-time VFL/AFL Premiership players